The 2015–16 Indiana State Sycamores women's basketball team represents Indiana State University during the 2015–16 NCAA Division I women's basketball season. The Sycamores, led by sixth year head coach Joey Wells, play their home games at the Hulman Center and were members of the Missouri Valley Conference. They finished the season 13–17, 9–9 in MVC play to finish in sixth place. They lost in the quarterfinals of the Missouri Valley women's tournament to Missouri State.

Roster

Schedule

|-
!colspan=9 style="background:#0F4D92; color:#FFFFFF;"| Exhibition

|-
!colspan=9 style="background:#0F4D92; color:#FFFFFF;"| Non-conference regular season

|-
!colspan=9 style="background:#0F4D92; color:#FFFFFF;"| Missouri Valley Conference regular season

|-
!colspan=9 style="background:#0F4D92; color:#FFFFFF;"| Missouri Valley Women's Tournament

See also
2015–16 Indiana State Sycamores men's basketball team

References

Indiana State Sycamores women's basketball seasons
Indiana State
Indiana State
Indiana State